Jake Neade (born 29 May 1994) is an Australian rules footballer who last played for the Port Adelaide Football Club in the Australian Football League (AFL).

Early life
Hailing from Elliott in the Northern Territory he made the move in his mid teens down to Victoria where he attended school at St Patrick's College, Ballarat where he shone as a real talent in the school's first XVIII, winning the Herald Sun Shield 3 times in 3 years. Neade is a midfielder/forward known for his attack and creativity with the ball and strong tackling. He won the Harrison Medal (Division 2 best and fairest) and achieved All-Australian honours in the 2012 AFL Under 18 Championships averaging 18.4 disposals and 3.6 tackles. Neade arrived at Port Adelaide as their smallest player weighing in at 67 kg and being 170 cm tall. He is an indigenous Australian.

AFL career
Neade made his unofficial debut with the Power in the 2013 NAB Cup opener against St Kilda showing bursts of speed, poise in close and a frenetic work-rate. He totaled 8 disposals and 1 goal in a half of football.

He played his first official AFL match in the opening round of the 2013 AFL season against Melbourne at the Melbourne Cricket Ground in Port's 79-point victory. For Round 13, 2013, Neade was awarded a NAB rising star nomination.

Statistics
Statistics are correct to the end of 2018.

|- style="background-color: #EAEAEA"
! scope="row" style="text-align:center" | 2013
|  || 32 || 16 || 11 || 6 || 90 || 57 || 147 || 24 || 56 || 0.7 || 0.4 || 5.6 || 3.6 || 9.2 || 1.5 || 3.5
|- 
! scope="row" style="text-align:center" | 2014
|  || 32 || 8 || 10 || 7 || 57 || 32 || 89 || 18 || 21 || 1.2 || 0.9 || 7.1 || 4.0 || 11.1 || 2.2 || 2.6
|- style="background-color: #EAEAEA"
! scope="row" style="text-align:center" | 2015
|  || 3 || 10 || 9 || 3 || 59 || 63 || 122 || 23 || 38 || 0.9 || 0.3 || 5.9 || 6.3 || 12.2 || 2.3 || 3.8
|- 
! scope="row" style="text-align:center" | 2016
|  || 3 || 17 || 15 || 5 || 93 || 95 || 188 || 31 || 63 || 0.9 || 0.3 || 5.5 || 5.6 || 11.1 || 1.8 || 3.7
|- style="background-color: #EAEAEA"
! scope="row" style="text-align:center" | 2017
|  || 3 || 7 || 6 || 1 || 51 || 55 || 106 || 18 || 30 || 0.9 || 0.1 || 7.3 || 7.9 || 15.1 || 2.6 || 4.3
|-
! scope="row" style="text-align:center" | 2018
|  || 3 || 8 || 4 || 6 || 34 || 45 || 79 || 13 || 31 || 0.5 || 0.8 || 4.2 || 5.6 || 9.9 || 1.6 || 3.9
|- class="sortbottom"
! colspan=3| Career
! 66
! 55
! 28
! 384
! 347
! 731
! 127
! 239
! 0.8
! 0.4
! 5.8
! 5.3
! 11.1
! 1.9
! 3.6
|}

Notes

References

External links

 

1994 births
Living people
Port Adelaide Football Club players
Port Adelaide Football Club players (all competitions)
Greater Western Victoria Rebels players
Australian rules footballers from the Northern Territory
Indigenous Australian players of Australian rules football
People educated at St Patrick's College, Ballarat
Australia international rules football team players